West Samoset is an unincorporated area and census-designated place (CDP) in Manatee County, Florida, United States. The population was 6,482 at the 2020 census, up from 5,583 in 2010. It is part of the Bradenton–Sarasota–Venice Metropolitan Statistical Area.

Geography
West Samoset is bordered to the north and northwest by the city of Bradenton, to the east by unincorporated Samoset, and to the west by unincorporated South Bradenton. U.S. Route 301 runs through the northern part of the community, while U.S. Route 41 forms the southwest border. Florida State Road 45 (1st Street) forms the western edge of the CDP.

Demographics

As of the census of 2000, there were 5,507 people, 1,814 households, and 1,246 families residing in the CDP. The racial makeup of the CDP was 60.40% White, 27.09% African American, 0.33% Native American, 0.84% Asian, 0.02% Pacific Islander, 8.70% from other races, and 2.63% from two or more races. Hispanic or Latino of any race were 22.23% of the population.

There were 1,814 households, out of which 41.3% had children under the age of 18 living with them, 38.9% were married couples living together, 22.8% had a female householder with no husband present, and 31.3% were non-families. 23.6% of all households were made up of individuals, and 12.7% had someone living alone who was 65 years of age or older.  The average household size was 2.88 and the average family size was 3.38.

In the CDP, the population was spread out, with 33.6% under the age of 18, 11.1% from 18 to 24, 28.4% from 25 to 44, 13.7% from 45 to 64, and 13.0% who were 65 years of age or older.  The median age was 28 years. For every 100 females, there were 94.6 males.  For every 100 females age 18 and over, there were 85.6 males.

The median income for a household in the CDP was $30,047, and the median income for a family was $31,379. Males had a median income of $22,348 versus $20,761 for females. The per capita income for the CDP was $13,027.  About 17.6% of families and 18.8% of the population were below the poverty line, including 26.3% of those under age 18 and 8.5% of those age 65 or over.

References

Census-designated places in Manatee County, Florida
Sarasota metropolitan area
Census-designated places in Florida